My Love Affair with Trains is the 20th studio album by American country singer Merle Haggard and The Strangers, released in 1976. The LP rose to number 7 on the Billboard country albums chart.

Background
The album recalls his 1969 tribute to Jimmie Rogers, Same Train, A Different Time but, with its between song narrations and freight train sound effects, more closely resembles Johnny Cash's 1960 concept album Ride This Train. Haggard, who was also a model train enthusiast, manages only one original composition, "No More Trains to Ride". "Here Comes the Freedom Train" would be the album's only hit single, peaking at number 10 and ending Haggard's incredible run of nine consecutive #1 hits. Other notable selections include the Dolly Parton-penned title track and Jimmy Buffett's "Railroad Lady."

In addition to releasing three albums in 1976, Haggard also appeared on an episode of The Waltons, playing country singer Red Turner, a recovering alcoholic.  He performs the song "Nobody's Darlin' But Mine."

Reception

Thom Jurek of AllMusic praises the album, maintaining that Haggard "weaves an iconographic history of the rails - from past to present to uncertain future - seamlessly and with great taste... [The album] may seem a bit quaint in retrospect, but its soul and emotion don't date. There is great truth in his performances of these songs, and like virtually everything he records, he tells the truth through these songs as he sees it."

Track listing
 "My Love Affair With Trains" (Dolly Parton)
 "Union Station" (Ronnie Reno)
 "Here Comes the Freedom Train" (Stephen H. Lemberg)
 "So Long Train Whistle" (Dave Kirby, Lew Quadling)
 "Silver Ghost" (Sterling Whipple)
 "No More Trains to Ride" (Merle Haggard)
 "Coming and the Going of the Trains" (Red Lane)
 "I Won't Give Up My Train" (Mark Yeary)
 "Where Have All the Hobos Gone" (Dave Kirby, Danny Morrison)
 "Railroad Lady" (Jimmy Buffett, Jerry Jeff Walker)
 "Hobo" (Dave Kirby, Glenn Martin)

Personnel
Merle Haggard– vocals, guitar

The Strangers:
Roy Nichols – lead guitar
Norman Hamlet – steel guitar, dobro
 Tiny Moore – mandolin
Eldon Shamblin– guitar
 Ronnie Reno – guitar
 Mark Yeary – piano
 James Tittle – bass
Biff Adam – drums
Don Markham – saxophone

With
 Dave Kirby – guitar
 Johnny Meeks – bass
 Johnny Gimble – fiddle

and
Hargus "Pig" Robbins – piano, organ
 Bob Moore – bass
 Buddy Harman – drums

Chart positions

References 

1976 albums
Merle Haggard albums
Capitol Records albums
Albums produced by Ken Nelson (United States record producer)